The Gdańsk refinery is an oil refinery located in Poland in the town Gdańsk.  It is owned by Grupa Lotos.  The refinery capacity is 210 kbpd of crude oil and it has a Nelson complexity index of approximately 10.

See also

 Oil refinery
 Petroleum
 List of oil refineries

Buildings and structures in Gdańsk
Energy in Poland
Oil refineries in Poland